Sándor Nagy is a Hungarian former ice dancer. With Gabriella Remport, he is a two-time Hungarian national champion. The duo competed at three World Championships and four European Championships. They were coached by Ilona Berecz.

Nagy works as a skating coach in Budapest. His former students include ice dance couples Zsuzsanna Nagy and György Elek, Emese László and Máté Fejes, and Krisztina Barta and Ádám Tóth.

Nagy married his ice dance partner Gabriella Remport. They are the parents of Hungarian ice dancer Zsuzsanna Nagy (born 10 June 1986 in Budapest).

Competitive highlights 
With Remport

References 

20th-century births
Hungarian male ice dancers
Hungarian figure skating coaches
Living people
Figure skaters from Budapest
Year of birth missing (living people)